From Out Here is a 2014 album by Cate Brooks, under the pseudonym of The Advisory Circle. It was released on 5 December 2014 by independent record label Ghost Box Music on CD, online download, and 12" vinyl record. The album cover art was designed by Julian House.

Concept 
Ghost Box Musics press release for From Out Here "hints at a Wyndham-esque science fiction story, where bucolic English scenery is being manipulated and maybe even artificially generated by bizarre multi-dimensional computer technology."

Reception 
Chicago Reader said From Out Here "exceeds all of my expectations—it's among the best work Brooks has ever done, and one of the finest albums of the year." DJ Food called the album "[Cate Brooks'] best yet" and "my favourite though as it embodies everything I love about the [Ghost Box Music] label" Pitchfork reviewed From Out Here with "[f]or a notionally darker work this album ends up being more enjoyable than some of [Cate Brooks'] prior records, mainly because the sense of exploration is heightened with each turn taken."

The Quietus called From Out Here a "particularly satisfying and coherent listening experience" and "beautifully crafted voyage into electronic music's substrata." Record Collector reviewed From Out Here with "Brooks, though, stands out by dint of a nimble melodic touch, compositional sophistication and a broader historical frame of references. This makes From Out Here both satisfying and hard to pin down."

Track listing

References

External links
Ghost Box Music page

The Advisory Circle albums
Ghost Box Music albums
2014 albums